Diphu Law College popularly known as DLC is a government law school situated at P.H.E. Colony, Diphu in Karbi Anglong in the Indian state of Assam. Diphu Law College was established in the year 1979.

Affiliations
It offers undergraduate 3 years LL.B. course affiliated to Assam University. The College is also affiliated with Bar Council of India, New Delhi.

See also 
 Assam University

References

Law schools in Assam
Educational institutions established in 1979
1979 establishments in Assam
Universities and colleges in Assam
Colleges affiliated to Assam University
Karbi Anglong district